Roccella phycopsis is a species of lichen in the family Roccellaceae. A study of Roccella phycopsis in Tunisia revealed that it contains methyl orcellinate, a chemical compound of interest for its anti-inflammatory activity.

References

phycopsis
Lichen species
Lichens described in 1804
Lichens of North Africa
Taxa named by Erik Acharius